The  is an arch dam on the Uji River just upstream from Uji, Kyoto Prefecture, Japan. The main purpose of the dam is flood control but it supports a hydroelectric power station and creates the lower reservoir for the Kisenyama Pumped Storage Plant. The dam itself serves a 92 MW power station while the pumped-storage power station upstream has a 466 MW capacity. Construction on the dam began in 1955 and it was complete in 1964. The pumped-storage power station became operational in 1970. Both plants are owned by Kansai Electric Power Company.

Design

Kisenyama Pumped Storage Plant

Using Lake Hōō as the lower reservoir, water is pumped up to the upper reservoir via two pump-generators. From the upper reservoir, water can be released back down to the power station  where the two 233 MW reversible Francis turbine pump-generators use it for power production.

This process can be repeated and generation usually occurs during peak usage periods. The first generator of the pumped-storage power station was operational in January 1970, and the second in July of that year. It has a maximum output of 466 MW.

See also

List of power stations in Japan

References

External links

Dams completed in 1964
Dams in Kyoto Prefecture
Arch dams
Pumped-storage hydroelectric power stations in Japan